Kaweah is a word in the ancient Yokuts language that means "crow" or "raven cry".  

Kaweah may also refer to:

Bodies of water
 Kaweah River in Tulare County, California 
 Lake Kaweah, a lake near Lemon Cove in Tulare County, California.

Mountains
 Mount Kaweah, a mountain of the Kaweah peaks ridge of California's Sierra Nevada, in Sequoia National Park.
 Black Kaweah, a mountain of the Kaweah peaks ridge of California's Sierra Nevada, in Sequoia National Park.
 Red Kaweah, a mountain of the Kaweah peaks ridge of California's Sierra Nevada, in Sequoia National Park.
 Kaweah Queen, a mountain of the Kaweah peaks ridge of California's Sierra Nevada, in Sequoia National Park.
 Kaweah Gap, a pass through the Great Western Divide, in Sequoia National Park, California.

Other
 Kaweah Indian Nation, a civic group interested in Native American interests.
 Kaweah Colony, a utopian Socialist community in central California during the 1880s.
 USS Kaweah (AO-15), a replenishment oiler ship in the United States Navy.
 Kaweah Bar, a racing horse.

See also
 Cahuilla (disambiguation)
 Coahuila, a state of Mexico